The  was a Japanese lunisolar calendar, in use from 1684 to 1753.  It was officially adopted in 1685.

History
The  Jōkyō-reki system was developed and explained by Shibukawa Shunkai. He recognized that the length of the solar year is 365.2417 days.

Shibukawa discovered errors in the traditional Chinese calendar, the Senmyō calendar, which had been in use for 800 years.

See also
 Japanese calendar
 Sexagenary cycle
 Jōkyō

References

External links
 National Diet Library, "The Japanese Calendar" -- historical overview plus illustrative images from library's collection

Specific calendars
History of science and technology in Japan
Time in Japan